Cosette Nell Kies (September 2, 1936 - September 18, 2004) was an American writer, librarian, and academic. She was a professor and occult researcher at Northern Illinois University where she served as chair of library and information services. Kies wrote on topics including public relations and marketing for libraries and horror fiction for young adults.

Life 
Kies was a native of Platteville, Wisconsin. Her sister was nutrition scientist Constance Kies. Kies completed a M.A. from University of Wisconsin–Madison in 1961. Her thesis was titled Eskimo Art: A Survey. On August 2, 1962, she became the children's librarian at Fond du Lac Public Library. Kies resigned on April 4, 1963 from her position at the library. She was a librarian at University of Nebraska–Lincoln in 1967. She was named assistant program coordinator of the divisional services department at the American Library Association in December 1967, with her term set to begin January 1. In 1970, Kies was a library career consultant at the Illinois State Careers Center. She was New York-based a public relations consultant, teacher, and author in 1975. Kies earned a Doctor of Liberal Studies from Columbia University in 1977. Her dissertation was titled Unofficial relations, personal reliance, informal influence, communication, and the library staff: a sociometric investigation of three medium-sized public libraries. In 1983, Kies was the president of Nashville's chapter of the Women's National Book Association. She was a professor and occult researcher at Northern Illinois University in 1983. Her work traced the origins of Halloween to the Celts and witchcraft. In 1991, Kies was the chair of Northern Illinois University Library and Information Services. Kies advocated for the inclusion of youth horror fiction as a way to encourage teenagers to visit libraries.

Selected works

References

1936 births
People from Platteville, Wisconsin
University of Wisconsin–Madison alumni
Columbia University alumni
American librarians
American women librarians
Northern Illinois University faculty
American women academics
Academics from Wisconsin
20th-century American women writers
American public relations people
2004 deaths
21st-century American women